Maciej Sarnacki (born February 10, 1987) is a Polish judoka. In 2021, he competed in the men's +100 kg event at the 2020 Summer Olympics held in Tokyo, Japan.

He also competed in the men's +100 kg event at the 2016 Summer Olympics held in Rio de Janeiro, Brazil.

References

External links
 
 

1987 births
Living people
Judoka at the 2016 Summer Olympics
Olympic judoka of Poland
Polish male judoka
Sportspeople from Olsztyn
Universiade medalists in judo
Universiade silver medalists for Poland
Universiade bronze medalists for Poland
Judoka at the 2015 European Games
European Games competitors for Poland
Judoka at the 2019 European Games
Medalists at the 2011 Summer Universiade
Medalists at the 2013 Summer Universiade
Judoka at the 2020 Summer Olympics
21st-century Polish people